Philip Sterling (October 9, 1922 – November 30, 1998) was an American film and television actor. He played Dr. Winston Croft on 28 episodes of the American daytime soap opera The Doctors. He also played Judge Truman Ventnor on 21 episodes in Sisters and Dr. Simon Weiss on 12 episodes in St. Elsewhere.

Sterling guest-starred in numerous television programs including The Golden Girls, M*A*S*H, The Rockford Files, Family Ties, Hart to Hart, Growing Pains, Night Court, The Wonder Years, The A-Team, Diff'rent Strokes and Newhart. He also appeared in a few episodes of Barney Miller, L.A. Law, Matlock, Guiding Light and Hotel. Sterling died in November 1998 in Woodland Hills, California of complications from myelofibrosis, at the age of 76.

Filmography

Film

Television

References

External links 

Rotten Tomatoes profile

1922 births
1998 deaths
People from New York (state)
American male television actors
American male film actors
American male soap opera actors
American soap opera actors
20th-century American male actors
University of Pennsylvania alumni